Telecom Italia San Marino S.p.A. (formerly Intelcom San Marino S.p.A.) is a Sammarinese telecommunications company, subsidiary of Telecom Italia S.p.A., mainly focused on VoIP services and other telephony services primarily targeted to ethnic and immigrant populations. It offer also fixed and mobile telephony services, Internet access, and is also the official Domain Name Registry for .sm, the top-level domain of San Marino.

Services 
Telecom Italia San Marino offers the following types of telecommunications services:

 Services for private and corporate users mainly intended for the Republic of San Marino
 Platform Services
 Internet data center services
 Top-Level Domain registration authority (.sm)

See also
 Telecom Italia
 Telecom Italia Mobile
 TIMvision

References

External links 
 

Telecom Italia
Companies established in 1992
Telecommunications companies of San Marino
1992 establishments in San Marino